H. B. Walikar (born 18 March 1951) was the vice-chancellor of the Karnatak University in Dharwad, India.

Walikar was arrested for corruption charges and removed from office.

References

Kannada people
Graph theorists
People from Bijapur district, Karnataka
1951 births
Living people
Academic staff of Karnatak University